Lucy Smith Collier (1925 – 2010), also known as "Little Lucy" Smith, was a gospel singer, pianist, organist, and composer. She led the female gospel group, The Little Lucy Smith Singers, and was a vocalist and accompanist for the Roberta Martin Singers. The granddaughter of Holiness preacher Elder Lucy Smith, she began playing organ at the All Nations Pentecostal Church at age twelve.  Among her more well-known compositions are "Oh My Lord, What a Time", "What a Blessing in Jesus," and "He's my Light," which became a hit for the Roberta Martin Singers.

Early Years
Lucy Smith was born in Chicago in 1925. Her mother, Viola, died when she was two years old, and thereafter, she was raised by her father, Rev. James Austin Smith, and her grandmother, a Holiness Pentecostal minister, Elder Lucy Smith. To distinguish her from her grandmother, she was called "Little Lucy Smith" as a child, a nickname that she would continue to use during her gospel career.

Little Lucy showed an aptitude for music at an early age, and when she was ten years old, her grandmother sent her to study piano with Roberta Martin, a gospel performer. In two years she had become a skilled gospel accompanist, and at the request of her grandmother, she began playing the organ at her church and directing the music program. Elder Smith, a highly successful preacher and healer, had founded the All Nations Pentecostal Church, the first church ever established in Chicago by a woman pastor.  Little Lucy's skill as an organist helped draw more worshippers to the already popular church. In 1933, the church began broadcasting its worship services on the radio through their "Glorious Church of the Air" program,  becoming one of the first black churches to broadcast its services. Through the radio program, Little Lucy Smith's music was heard by people far beyond the Chicago area.

Recording career
In 1948, Smith published her first original gospel song, “What a Blessing in Jesus I’ve Found."

In her teens, she formed the Lucy Smith Trio, which later became the Little Lucy Smith Singers. She was joined by Catherine Campbell, Gladys Beamon Gregory and Sarah McKissick Simmons. By the mid-1950s, they had gained a significant following; their version of "Somebody Bigger Than You and I" was one of their most popular recordings. They also recorded “Come Unto Me,” “Jesus, Lover of My Soul” and “Down on My Knees.”

In the late 1950s, Little Lucy Smith joined the Roberta Martin Singers. She arranged much of their music, in addition to singing and playing piano and organ.  Her organ playing was very popular and in 1962, she released a solo record of gospel tunes, entitled "Little Lucy Smith at the Organ." She suffered a stroke in her 50s, which ended her professional career as an accompanist. She continued to sing however.

In 1981, the Smithsonian Institution held a ceremony to honor the Roberta Martin Singers, and many of her gospel songs were acquired by the Smithsonian.

Death and legacy
She died in 2010, at the age of 85. In her obituary, gospel music producer Anthony Heilbut is quoted as saying, "She is one of the most influential gospel pianists who ever played."   James Cleveland and Richard Smallwood, among others, were influenced by her style of playing.  Her music is featured on several compilations of music, including "The Great Gospel Women," published in 1993 by Shanachie Records.

See also
Gospel Music
The Roberta Martin Singers

External links 

 KWBU feature on The Little Lucy Smith Singers 
 Somebody Bigger than You and I - The Lucy Smith Singers on YouTube

References/Notes and references

1925 births
2010 deaths
African-American pianists
American gospel singers
20th-century American pianists
Gospel music pianists
20th-century American women pianists
Singers from Chicago
African-American women musicians
20th-century African-American women
20th-century African-American people
20th-century African-American musicians
21st-century African-American people
21st-century African-American women